Sofiane Djeffal (born 19 April 1999) is a French professional footballer who plays as a midfielder for Austin FC.

Career

College 
Ahead of the 2018 NCAA Division I men's soccer season, Djeffal signed a National Letter of Intent to play college soccer at Oregon State University for the Oregon State Beavers men's soccer program. During his freshman year, Djeffal was an immediate starter in the squad, starting and playing in all 20 matches during his freshman season. During the freshman campaign, he had five goals and seven assists. At the end of his freshman season he received numerous Pac-12 Conference and national accolades includingbeing named the Pac-12 Men's Soccer Freshman of the Year, being named to the All-Pac-12 First Team (best XI), and to the TopDrawer Soccer best XI.

He remained a full-time starter in his sophomore season, starting and playing in all 16 matches his sophomore year, having three goals and six assists. During his junior year, he started 10 of the 11 matches, contributing to 6 goals and two assists. He was named to the All-Pac-12 First Team both his sophomore and season. During his senior year at Oregon State, Djeffal started in all 19 matches, contributing to six goals and six assists. Upon conclusion of the 2021 NCAA Division I men's soccer season, Djeffal was named the Pac-12 Conference Men's Soccer Player of the Year and an semifinalist for the Hermann Trophy, an annual award for the best college soccer player in the United States.

While at college, Djeffal appeared for USL League Two side Portland Timbers U23s during their 2019 season, making two appearances.

D.C. United 
On 11 January 2022, Djeffal was drafted in the second round with the 36th overall pick for D.C. United in the 2022 MLS SuperDraft. After impressing in preseason training, he signed a contract with United on 25 February 2022.

On 26 February 2022, Djeffal made his professional debut for United, coming on in the final 26 minutes in a 3–0 win over Charlotte FC.

Following the 2022 season, his contract option was declined by D.C. United. He was selected by Austin FC in the MLS Re-Entry Draft Stage 1.

Personal life
Born in France, Djeffal is of Algerian descent.

Career statistics

Club

Honors 
Individual
 Pac-12 Conference Men's Soccer Player of the Year: 2021

References

External links 
 

1999 births
Living people
Footballers from Nantes
French footballers
French sportspeople of Algerian descent
All-American men's college soccer players
Association football midfielders
Austin FC players
D.C. United draft picks
D.C. United players
Oregon State Beavers men's soccer players
Portland Timbers U23s players
USL League Two players
French expatriate footballers
Major League Soccer players
Expatriate soccer players in the United States
French expatriate sportspeople in the United States